Atotonilco El Alto is a town and municipality, in Jalisco in Los Altos (Jalisco) region in central-western Mexico. The municipality covers an area of 638.15 km.

Atotonilco (pronounced ah-toh-toh-NEAL-co) means "place of hot waters", in Náhuatl. "El Alto"("The High One") was later added in honor of those who died in the Cristero War in the early 1920s.

As of 2005, the municipality had a total population of 51,798.

History
The town was first established by the Purépecha in late 1400, according to Purépecha myth. The region was conquered in June 1530 by the Nuño de Guzmán. Martin del Campo was the first encomendero and the evangelization of the region was entrusted to the Franciscans. Atotonilco in 1551 was given in encomienda to the conquistador Andrés de Villanueva. In November 1824 the State Congress ruled that the village of Atotonilco hereafter would have the title of town, and would also be the head of the department which includes Arandas and Ayotlán. On May 15, 1868, the governor of Jalisco, Antonio Gómez Cuervo, elevated the status of Atotonilco to a city, which it retains to this day.

Atotonilco El Alto municipality 
Has 112 towns. Atotonilco El Alto, Cienega del Pastor, Milpillas, La Santa Rosa, La Cofradia, San Francisco de Asís, Santa Elena, La Guadalupana, San Joaquin, El, Ojo de Agua de Morán, El Agua Caliente, El Nacimiento, San Jose del Valle, San Joaquin, San Antonio de Fernandez, Nuevo Valle, Margaritas, La Purisma, Los Adobes and more.

Taretan Water Park
In 1950, Taretan Water Park started functioning as a natural hot spring bath and an amusement place for families located at the sides of the Taretan River. Taretan was founded in the highlands of Jalisco. It was remodeled in the mid-1920s and now it houses a stone statue of St. Michael Archangel the Patron Saint of Atotonilco. It also has several sheds with tables and chairs made out of stone, dressing rooms, and a playground for young children to play. This park is mostly known for its waters. Hispanic legend of this place claims that the waters in Taretan have healing properties.

Notable people 

 Venerable Maria Luisa de la Peña, Mexican Roman Catholic nun and founder of the Carmelite Sisters of the Most Sacred Heart of Los Angeles
 José Trinidad Sepúlveda Ruiz-Velasco, Bishop of San Juan de los Lagos, Jalisco
 General Enrique Gorostieta was killed there during the Cristero War.

References

External links

 Atotonilco El Alto municipality
 Atoto Website
 https://web.archive.org/web/20160624004408/http://atotonilco.gob.mx/atogobmx1215/atotonilco-el-alto/turismo/naturaleza/322-parque-taretan

Municipalities of Jalisco
Populated places established in 1528